Liza Tarbuck (born 21 November 1964) is an English actress, comedian, and television and radio presenter.

Early life
Liza Tarbuck was born in Liverpool and grew up near Kingston upon Thames. She is the daughter of comedian Jimmy Tarbuck and his wife Pauline, with an older sister, Cheryl, and a younger brother, James. She trained at the National Youth Theatre and RADA graduating in 1986 alongside Clive Owen, Rebecca Pidgeon, and Mark Womack.

Acting
Tarbuck's first big break came in 1987 when she landed a starring role in the Granada Television comedy series Watching, opposite Emma Wray. She stayed with Watching for its entire seven-year run. She also appeared as Angie in the 1988 Falklands War drama Tumbledown, which starred Colin Firth, Paul Rhys and David Calder. 

In 2001, she took the title role in Linda Green, which ran for two series, ending in 2002.

She guest starred on the Ricky Gervais comedy Extras, and appeared in The Inspector Lynley Mysteries as DI Fiona Knight. 

In 2004, she appeared in Series 6 of the BBC One comedy French & Saunders, as a fictionalised version of herself, where she had the role of producer for "Saunders & French Productions" with Christopher Hague-Moody. 

In 2005, she appeared as Mrs Jellyby in the BBC One serial Bleak House, and in 2006 she appeared in episode six of the sitcom Saxondale, as a full-figured rock chick.

In 2007, she provided a voiceover for the animated Doctor Who adventure The Infinite Quest. 2007 also saw her starring in the ITV1 comedy drama Bonkers.

In 2009 she starred as Tina in her first role in a feature film, in The Be All and End All, and since 2016 she has played the part of Anne Hathaway in the BBC Two comedy series Upstart Crow.

In 2019, she starred in How Europe Stole My Mum. This Channel 4 comedy documentary, presented by comedian Kieran Hodgson and also starring Harry Enfield, examines how Brexit came about and how the divided country might be put back together.

Presenting
She presented the fashion programme She's Gotta Have It in 1998 and The Big Breakfast with Johnny Vaughan, Sara Cox and Richard Bacon. In 2001, she teamed up with her father for a celebrity edition of Who Wants to Be a Millionaire? In the early 2000s, she hosted the Sky One game show Blockbusters and has been a guest presenter on Have I Got News for You. In 2003, she hosted Channel 4's Emmy Award winning panel-discussion/gameshow Without Prejudice?.

She hosted a late-night edition of Win, Lose or Draw, and has presented Britain's Top Dog, as well as narrating the last series of the documentary Airport in 2005.

She presented a one-off quiz for Five called I Blame the Spice Girls to celebrate Five's tenth birthday. She has also appeared in advertisements for the supermarket Asda.

She signed a deal with Sky One to present a show called Pet Nation alongside Huey Morgan in 2010.

She narrated the Channel 4 dieting show Supersize vs Superskinny since 2008.

In 2015, Tarbuck narrated the Animal Planet series Meet The Orangutans.

Radio

BBC Radio 4
Tarbuck played Helen Golightly in the BBC Radio 4 programme Clare in the Community from series 5 to series 9, taking over from Gemma Craven. She has also appeared in other shows for BBC Radio 4, such as Just a Minute and a story about Jayne Mansfield. In December 2016 she presented Remembering Ronnie Corbett, a tribute to the late comedy star. In October 2017 she appeared on Front Row with Harry Hill. In December 2017 she was a guest on Radio 4's Saturday Live. In January 2018 she was a guest on Great Lives, talking about the Serbian-American scientist Nikola Tesla.

BBC Radio 2

During September 2007 Tarbuck co-presented the weekday afternoon show on BBC Radio 2 with Mark Radcliffe, whilst Steve Wright was on leave. In December 2007 (and again in January and March 2008), she once more hosted the show, this time as a solo presenter. In July 2008 she once again co-presented with Radcliffe.

In December 2008 and January 2009 she presented the Saturday morning slot on BBC Radio 2 with Martin Freeman whilst Jonathan Ross was away from the station, and again in August 2009 alongside Huey Morgan of Fun Lovin' Criminals. The pair presented the show again in November 2009.

For a week in March 2009 she stood in for Sarah Kennedy's popular Dawn Patrol show.

Tarbuck stood in for Simon Mayo on his BBC Radio 2 Drivetime Show for three weeks in July/August 2010 also covering the show on 18–22 April in 2011, 1–19 August in 2011, 4–8 June 2012, 14–18 February 2013, 15 July 2013, 26–30 May 2014, 6–10 April 2015 and 14 June 2016. On 9 October 2018, she presented the Drivetime show (5pm–8pm) with Simon Mayo while Jo Whiley was away from the station.

On 25 December 2009, she presented a four-hour show on BBC Radio 2 called Liza Tarbuck's Christmas, from midnight until 4am. 

In 2013, she presented a BBC Radio 2 special celebrating the career of the British comedian Ken Dodd called How Tickled I've Been.

In 2015, she visited Mary Berry at her home for a BBC Radio 2 Christmas Eve special.

On Sunday 8 October 2017, she stood in for Michael Ball on his 11am1pm show.

On Wednesday 25 December 2019, she presented a Christmas day special called 'Family Rhythms', 6pm8pm. Guests included film director Richard Curtis, Strictly Come Dancing star AJ Pritchard, Love Island star Curtis Pritchard, and Spandau Ballet brothers Martin Kemp and Gary Kemp. Tarbuck presented another Christmas Day special in 2020.

Since May 2012 she has presented her own radio show on BBC Radio 2, between 6pm and 8pm, on Saturdays, replacing Going out with Alan Carr presented by Carr and Melanie Sykes.

UK Radio Aid
UK Radio Aid was a charitable event in the United Kingdom held on Monday 17 January 2005 to raise money for the DEC appeal for the victims of the Asian tsunami. The event consisted of a twelve-hour radio show broadcast on 268 radio stations with an audience of over 20 million. Tarbuck presented the 16:00–18:00 slot with her former Big Breakfast co-host Johnny Vaughan.

Writing
I An Distracted By Everything [sic], written by Tarbuck, was published in November 2017.-Tarbuck described the one-off publication as "an annual for grown-ups".

Film and television appearances

References

External links
 Liza Tarbuck (BBC Radio 2)
 

1964 births
Living people
Actresses from Liverpool
Alumni of RADA
BBC Radio 2 presenters
English game show hosts
English film actresses
English television actresses
English television presenters
National Youth Theatre members
Radio presenters from Liverpool
Television presenters from Liverpool
British women radio presenters